James Anders Mikael "Gädda" Hansson Finér (born 15 March 1968) is a Swedish former professional footballer who played as a right back. He represented Söderköpings IK, IFK Norrköping, and Stoke City during a career that spanned between 1988 and 2001. He won one cap for the Sweden national team in 1994.

Career
Hansson was born in Norrköping and played for Söderköpings IK and his home team IFK Norrköping. He spent nine years at Idrottsparken in which time he won the Allsvenskan title with in 1992 as he made 206 appearances scoring 19 goals in Sweden's top flight. In November 1999 he left for English third-tier club Stoke City where he became a popular player with the club's supporters.

He impressed as a speedy right back and in his first season with the club he helped them to win the Football League Trophy and reach the play-offs, losing out to Gillingham. During the 2000–01 season Hansson again helped Stoke reach the play-off but Walsall proved to be too strong. He scored his only two league goals for Stoke against Bristol Rovers on 31 March 2001. Hanson's Stoke career was ended after he picked up an ankle injury in the summer of 2001 and he was never able to recover and so decided to retire from playing football.

Career statistics

Club
Sources:

International
Appearances and goals by national team and year

Honours
IFK Norrköping
Allsvenskan: 1992
Svenska Cupen: 1990–91, 1993–94

Stoke City
Football League Trophy: 2000

References

1968 births
Living people
Swedish footballers
Stoke City F.C. players
English Football League players
IFK Norrköping players
Sweden international footballers
Association football defenders
Sportspeople from Norrköping
Footballers from Östergötland County